Adam Poniński (1732 or 1733 – 23 July 1798 was a Polish nobleman, Prince, one of the leaders of the Radom Confederation of 1767, Grand Treasurer of the Crown (from 1775), member of the Permanent Council, he is remembered as the infamous Marshal of the Sejm (together with Michał Hieronim Radziwiłł) of the Partition Sejm (1773–1775). Considered by many contemporaries and historians a traitor, serving Russian ambassadors, he was stripped of all titles and exiled by the decree of the Great Sejm in 1790 but restored soon afterwards by the Confederation of Targowica.

His son, Adam Poniński, born in 1758, became a military general.

References

Jerzy Jan Lerski, Piotr Wróbel, Richard J. Kozicki, Historical Dictionary of Poland, 966–1945, Greenwood Publishing Group, 1996, Google Print, p.466

1732 births
1798 deaths
Radom confederates